is Pink Lady's 17th single, and their first single not to reach the top 40. The duo broke away from their disco and teen pop music, and they focused more on soft rock music.

When the single was released in Japan, Pink Lady was residing in the U.S. for the shooting of Pink Lady & Jeff, and thus had not the time to properly promote the record. It was performed on only one Japanese TV show. Unlike their previous records, they did not have any synchronized choreography for their performance.

The song sold 200,000 copies.

Track listing (7" vinyl)
All lyrics are written by Shizuka Ijūin; all music composed by Yūichirō Oda; all arrangement by Ryō Kawakami.

Chart positions

Cover versions
Keiko Masuda self-covered the song in her 2014 covers album .

References

External links
 
 

1980 singles
1980 songs
Pink Lady (band) songs
Japanese-language songs
Soft rock songs
Victor Entertainment singles